Dodecyl acetate or lauryl acetate, CH3COO(CH2)11CH3, is the dodecyl ester of acetic acid. It has a floral odor and is useful as a perfume additive.

References

Acetate esters